Paul Trewhela (born 1941) is a South African journalist and a former political prisoner.

Biography 
Trewhela was born in Johannesburg, South Africa, in 1941, educated at Michaelhouse in KwaZulu-Natal.
Trewhela worked in underground journalism with Ruth First and edited the underground journal of Umkhonto we Sizwe, Freedom Fighter, during the Rivonia Trial. He was a political prisoner in Pretoria and the Johannesburg Fort as a member of the South African Communist Party (SACP) in 1964–1967, separating from the SACP while in prison. In exile in Britain, he was co-editor with the late Baruch Hirson of Searchlight South Africa, which was banned in South Africa.

In regard to his ideology Trewhela has stated: "I was a Trotskyist, and, yes, a 'committed Marxist' through to the end of working on Searchlight South Africa. But I'm not a Marxist any longer. Marx's conception of the 'dictatorship of the proletariat' gave a licence to totalitarian dictators of all kinds, and Marxism's economic determinism and alleged 'scientific' philosophy are way off beam. I'm much more aware than before how fragile are the little shoots of civil society, and how they need nurturing, and how easily they are crushed by very ideological people who claim to have a universal panacea, usually violent. They're the dangerous people in southern Africa, as Robert Mugabe and his regime have shown."

Honours 

In 2007 he received the St Michael Award from his alma-mater, Michaelhouse.

Publications

See also

Notes and references

Further reading 

 

1941 births
Living people
Anti-apartheid activists
People from Johannesburg
South African journalists
Alumni of Michaelhouse